The National Library of Pakistan (Urdu:) is located in the vicinity of the Red Zone, Islamabad, Pakistan. Argued to be the country's oldest cultural institution, the library is a leading resource for information— ancient and new. The National Library collection includes approximately 66% of all serial and 50-55% of all books publications in the country. 

Designed with Eastern architecture, the library includes space for 500 readers, has 15 research rooms, a 450-seat auditorium, and provides computer and microfilm services.  At its opening in 1993, the library owned a collection of 130,000 volumes and 600 manuscripts. The National Library's mission is to promote literacy and serve as a dynamic cultural and educational center for the state's capital Islamabad.

History 

Authorization for a national library can be traced back to 1949, although it was not established until 1951 under the secretariat of the Ministry of Education (MoEd). However, there was no physical library infrastructure until 1954 when the National Library merged with the existing Liaquat Memorial Library in Karachi, and was renamed the Liaquat National Library (LNL). Plans began to move it to Islamabad in 1963, and 1968 saw the separation of the Liaquat and National libraries, with the latter relocated to Pakistan's capitol, Islamabad. The library was housed in a series of rented structures until construction of a permanent building was completed in 1988. The formal opening took place on the 24th of August 1993. Scholar Syed Jalaluddin Haider dates the library's existence later, to April 1999, when the 100,000-volume collection housed by the Department of Libraries was physically moved into the new building.

In 1962, the Library received the right of transference of all copyrighted works to be deposited into its collections. In 1963, the Library began receiving two copies of all books, maps, illustrations and diagrams printed in Pakistan as part of the ordinance. During the Indo-Pakistani War of 1971, the library was thinned with the creation of Bangladesh with key material transferring to Bangladesh. After a period of slow growth in its reconstruction, the library began to enlarge its size and importance in the country.  Development culminated in the 1980s of an expensive and separated national library building within the vicinity of the Supreme Court's library. It gained more significance in 1992 with the promulgation of copyright (amendment) act 1992. In addition to deposited collections that began in 1993, clauses to include electronic publications as deposit material were also being added to the Copyright law in 2014.

See also 
 List of libraries

References

External links 
 National Library of Pakistan - Official site

Pakistan
Libraries in Pakistan
ISBN agencies
Islamabad
1951 establishments in Pakistan
Libraries established in 1951
Deposit libraries
Archives in Pakistan
World Digital Library partners
Legislative libraries
Pakistan federal departments and agencies
Auditoriums in Pakistan